Luigi Rizzo (F 596) was a Bergamini-class frigate of the Italian Navy.

Construction and career 
She was laid down on 26 May 1957 and launched on 6 March 1960 by Navalmeccanica. She was commissioned on 15 December 1961.

Luigi Rizzo and Carlo Bergamini were discarded in 1980 and 1981 respectively.

Gallery

References 
 Blackman, Raymond V. B. Jane's Fighting Ships 1962–63. London: Sampson Low, Marston & Company, 1962.
 Blackman, Raymond V. B. Jane's Fighting Ships 1971–72. London: Sampson Low, Marston & Company, 1971. .
 Gardiner, Robert and Stephen Chumbley. Conway's All The World's Fighting Ships 1947–1995. Annapolis, Maryland USA: Naval Institute Press, 1995. .

Ships built in Italy
1960 ships
Bergamini-class frigates